Theodore G. Streissguth (August 10, 1855 – October 3, 1915) was an American businessman and politician.

Streissguth was born in New Glarus, Green County, Wisconsin. He went to the private and public schools in Fond du Lac, Wisconsin and Milwaukee, Wisconsin. Streissguth moved to Minnesota and then settled in Arlington, Sibley County, Minnesota in 1878. Streissguth lived in Arlington, Minnesota with his wife and family and was a merchant. He served on the Arlington Village Council and on the Arlington Board of Education. Streissguth served in the Minnesota Senate from 1891 to 1894. Streissguth died from cancer at his home in Arlington, Minnesota and was buried in Arlington, Minnesota.

References

1855 births
1915 deaths
People from New Glarus, Wisconsin
People from Sibley County, Minnesota
Businesspeople from Minnesota
Minnesota city council members
School board members in Minnesota
Minnesota state senators
Deaths from cancer in Minnesota